Jang Hee-jung is a South Korean actress. She is known for her roles in dramas such as Mistress, Hospital Playlist, Late Night Restaurant, Voice 2 and Three Bold Siblings.

Personal life 
She married actor Ahn Chang-hwan and has one son.

Filmography

Television series

Film

Theatre

References

External links 
 

1982 births
Living people
21st-century South Korean actresses
South Korean television actresses
South Korean film actresses